Beech Creek Township is one of fifteen townships in Greene County, Indiana, USA.  As of the 2010 census, its population was 2,595.

Geography
The stream of Dry Branch runs through this township.

Unincorporated towns
 Hendricksville
 McVille
 Newark
 Solsberry
(This list is based on USGS data and may include former settlements.)

Adjacent townships
 Clay Township, Owen County (north)
 Richland Township, Monroe County (northeast)
 Van Buren Township, Monroe County (east)
 Indian Creek Township, Monroe County (southeast)
 Center Township (south)
 Richland Township (southwest)
 Highland Township (west)
 Franklin Township, Owen County (northwest)

Cemeteries
The township contains ten cemeteries: Arthur, Edwards, Hudson, Liberty, Livingston, Minks, Newark, Philpot, Pryor, and Solsberry.

Major highways

References
 
 United States Census Bureau cartographic boundary files

External links
 Indiana Township Association
 United Township Association of Indiana

Townships in Greene County, Indiana
Bloomington metropolitan area, Indiana
Townships in Indiana